The Romania men's national basketball team represents Romania in international basketball competition. The team is administered by the Romanian Basketball Federation (FRB).

Romania has qualified for the EuroBasket 18 times throughout their history. Their best tournament results occurred in 1957 and 1967 respectively, where they finished fifth. The national team has also appeared at the Olympic Games once, in 1952. However, Romania has yet to clinch qualification for their first trip to the FIBA World Cup.

History

EuroBasket 1935
At the first European Championship in Geneva, the Romania national team finished in last place in the then ten team tournament. Losing all three of their matches; 42-9 to Switzerland, 66-23 to France, and 24-17 to Hungary.

EuroBasket 1947
Romania returned to the European championship twelve years later in Prague, for the EuroBasket 1947. Romania finished with a record of 1-2 after the preliminary round, which eliminated them from championship contention but they earned their first ever EuroBasket victory against the Netherlands. The Romanians added two more in the classification semifinal, as they defeated Austria and Albania. This put them in a classification match against Italy for 9th and 10th place, which Romania lost 55-39. The national team thus placed tenth again, but this time they had outranked four teams to do so, due to the expansion of the tournament to 14.

EuroBasket 1951
The Romanian national team entered the EuroBasket 1951 in Paris, but withdrew before any games were played, so official records gave them three preliminary round losses, each with a score of 2-0.

1952 Summer Olympics
Romania managed to qualify for the 1952 Summer Olympics in Helsinki, where the national team finished 23rd. It was the first and only time they qualified for the Olympic Basketball Tournament.

EuroBasket 1953
The EuroBasket 1953 in Moscow was the next European tournament in which the Romanians actually played.  They finished in 3rd place in their preliminary round group with a 1-2 record and advanced to the classification rounds.  They won 3 of their 4 games there, finishing in a three-way tie for the top spot of the group.  They lost out on the tiebreaker though and were relegated to the 13th-16th place semifinals.  Winning that game and their next, the Romanians finished in 13th place of the 17 teams in the tournament.

EuroBasket 1955
Romania was much more successful two years later, at the EuroBasket 1955 in Budapest.  A preliminary round loss to the global power house Soviet Union mattered little, as the national team won their other three preliminary matches against Sweden, Switzerland and Luxembourg to take second place in the group behind the Soviets to advance to the final round.  There, they won games against Poland and Yugoslavia to finish 2-5 in the final round to take 7th place in the 18-team tournament.

EuroBasket 1957
Romania came within a single point of winning their preliminary pool at EuroBasket 1957 in Sofia, losing to Hungary in the narrow match.  They beat their other two opponents Belgium and Finland to finish in second place in the pool to advance into the final round.  There, they matched up again with Hungary, but the game wasn't as close as the Hungarians cruised to a 76-61 victory. The national team also lost to the other three pool winners, to finish with a 3-4 record to end the tournament in 5th place.

Later years
The team repeated its most successful campaign at the EuroBasket 1967 when it finished 5th again. The following years, the team had some successful performances but after 1987, it ceded completely from Europe's elite events. After 30 years of absence, Romania returned to the EuroBasket in 2017 when the country gained hosting rights alongside Finland, Israel and Turkey. However, the national team ended its participation with five losses in its five games played.

EuroBasket 2022 qualification
After defeating both Slovakia and Cyprus twice, the Tricolorii advanced to the final qualification round where they came short of their second EuroBasket qualification since 1987. The team was coached by Tudor Costescu.

Competitive record

FIBA World Cup

Olympic Games

EuroBasket

Results and fixtures

2021

2022

2023

Team

Current roster
Roster for the EuroBasket 2025 Pre-Qualifiers matches on 23 and 26 February 2023 against Bulgaria and Cyprus.

Depth chart

Head coach position

Notable players
Andrei Folbert – First Romanian Basketball "Maestru Emerit Al Sportului"
Gheorghe Mureșan – First Romanian to play in the NBA
Constantin Popa
Horia Demian
Ernie Grunfeld

Past rosters
1935 EuroBasket: finished 10th among 10 teams

3 Nae Alexandrescu, 4 Balteanu, 5 O.Belitoreanu, 6 M.Bercus, 7 E.Dumitrescu, 8 Nicu Grozavescu, 9 Samy Grunstein, 10 C.Riegler (Coach: C. O. Lecca)

1947 EuroBasket: finished 10th among 14 teams

3 Constantin Herold, 4 N.Badulescu, 5 H.Dlugos, 6 S.Ferencz, 7 H.Kevorkian, 8 P.Marossi, 9 Alexandru Popescu, 10 S.Sadeanu, 11 Gh.Teodorescu, 12 I.Vulescu, 13 Vasile Popescu, 14 A.Neagu, 21 C.Babaliescu (Coach: C.Virgolici)

1952 Olympic Games: finished 23rd among 23 teams

3 Cornel Călugăreanu, 5 Grigore Costescu, 6 Emanoil Răducanu, 7 Andrei Folbert, 8 Ladislau Mokos, 9 Liviu Naghy, 10 Mihai Nedef, 11 Cezar Niculescu, 12 Dan Niculescu, 13 Adrian Petroșanu, 15 Vasile Popescu, 16 Gheorghe Constantinide (Coach: Alexandru Popescu)

1953 EuroBasket: finished 13th among 17 teams

3 Mihai Nedef, 4 Cezar Niculescu, 5 Trajan Lita, 6 Andrei Folbert, 7 Emanoil Răducanu, 8 Dan Niculescu, 9 Adrian Petroșanu, 10 Alexandru Fodor, 11 Corneliu Calugareanu, 12 Mihai Erdogh, 13 Liviu Naghy, 14 Vasile Kadar (Coach: Alexandru Popescu)

1955 EuroBasket: finished 7th among 18 teams

3 E.Ganea, 4 R.Popovici, 5 Mihai Nedef, 6 Andrei Folbert, 7 Emanoil Răducanu, 8 Dan Niculescu, 9 Emil Niculescu, 10 Alexandru Fodor, 11 Mihai Erdogh, 12 Marian Spiridon, 13 Liviu Naghy, 14 Vasile Kadar, 15 Corneliu Calugareanu (Coach: Vasile Popescu)

1957 EuroBasket: finished 5th among 16 teams

3 Grigore Costescu, 4 A.Borbely, 5 Mihai Nedef, 6 Andrei Folbert, 7 Emanoil Răducanu, 8 Alexandru Berecky, 9 Emil Niculescu, 10 Alexandru Fodor, 11 Mihai Erdogh, 12 Armand Nováček, 13 Liviu Naghy, 14 A Koukouch (Coach: Alexandru Popescu)

1959 EuroBasket: finished 8th among 17 teams

3 Feodor Nedelea, 4 Armand Nováček, 5 Grigore Costescu, 6 Andrei Folbert, 7 Mihai Nedef, 8 Emeric Vizi, 9 Emil Niculescu, 10 Alexandru Fodor, 11 Dragos Nosievici, 12 Cristian Popescu, 13 Ludovic Toth, 14 Jzidor Milelman (Coach: Constantin Herold)

1961 EuroBasket: finished 7th among 19 teams

4 Aurel Popovici, 5 Emil Niculescu, 6 Horatiu Giurgiu, 7 Mihai Nedef, 8 Nicolae Viciu, 9 Mihai Albu, 10 Pavel Visner, 11 Dragos Nosievici, 12 Cristian Popescu, 13 Armand Nováček, 14 Horia Demian, 15 Gheorghe Valeriu (Coach: Constantin Herold)

1963 EuroBasket: finished 11th among 16 teams

4 Horia Demian, 5 Emil Niculescu, 6 Marian Spiridon, 7 Mihai Nedef, 8 Mihai Kiss, 9 Mihai Albu, 10 Horatiu Giurgiu, 11 Dragos Nosievici, 12 Cristian Popescu, 13 Pavel Visner, 14 Mircea Cimpeanu, 15 Gheorghe Valeriu (Coach: Vasile Popescu)

1965 EuroBasket: finished 13th among 16 teams

4 Horia Demian, 5 Gheorghe Novac, 6 Marian Spiridon, 7 Mihai Nedef, 8 Nicolae Ionescu, 9 Mihai Albu, 10 Alin Savu, 11 Dragos Nosievici, 12 Cristian Popescu, 13 Armand Nováček, 14 Ekehardt Jekely, 15 Aurel Popovici (Coach: Vasile Popescu)

1967 EuroBasket: finished 5th among 16 teams

4 Adolf Cernea, 5 Gheorghe Novac, 6 Dragos Nosievici, 7 Alin Savu, 8 Ekehardt Jekely, 9 Mihai Albu, 10 Gheorghe Barau, 11 Nicolae Birsan, 12 Cristian Popescu, 13 Titus Tarau, 14 Radu Diaconescu, 15 Horia Demian (Coach: Alexandru Popescu)

1969 EuroBasket: finished 9th among 12 teams

4 Francisc Dikay, 5 Matei Ruhring, 6 Dragos Nosievici, 7 Constantin Dragomirescu, 8 Ekehardt Jekely, 9 Mihai Albu, 10 Petru Czmor, 11 Radu Diaconescu, 12 Gheorghe Novac, 13 Titus Tarau, 14 Mihai Dimancea, 15 Adolf Cernea (Coach: Alexandru Popescu)

1971 EuroBasket: finished 8th among 12 teams

4 Dan Georgescu, 5 Mircea Chivulescu, 6 Nicolae Pirsu, 7 Alin Savu, 8 Dan Niculescu, 9 Mihai Albu, 10 Constantin Dragomirescu, 11 Radu Diaconescu, 12 Gheorghe Cimpeanu, 13 Titus Tarau, 14 Gheorghe Oczelak, 15 Vasile Popa (Coach: Alexandru Popescu)

1973 EuroBasket: finished 9th among 12 teams

4 Gheorghe Cimpeanu, 5 Mircea Chivulescu, 6 Nicolae Pirsu, 7 Nicolae Manaila, 8 Dan Niculescu, 9 Dan Georgescu, 10 Costel Cernat, 11 Radu Diaconescu, 12 Gheorghe Novac, 13 Titus Tarau, 14 Gheorghe Oczelak, 15 Vasile Popa (Coach: Alexandru Popescu)

1975 EuroBasket: finished 11th among 12 teams

4 Dan Georgescu, 5 Georghe Mihuta, 6 Vasile Zdrenghea, 7 Dan Moisescu, 8 Nicolae Pirsu, 9 Dan Niculescu, 10 Costel Cernat, 11 Radu Diaconescu, 12 Gheorghe Novac, 13 Titus Tarau, 14 Gheorghe Oczelak, 15 Vasile Popa (Coach: Mihai Nedef)

1985 EuroBasket: finished 10th among 12 teams

4 Florentin Ermurache, 5 Attila Szabó, 6 Viorel Constantin, 7 Ioan Ionescu, 8 Doru Rădulescu, 9 Dan Niculescu, 10 Costel Cernat, 11 Roman Opsitaru, 12 Anton Netolitzchi, 13 Victor Jacob, 14 Marian Marinache, 15 Alexandru Vinereanu (Coach: Gheorghe Novac)

1987 EuroBasket: finished 12th among 12 teams

4 Florentin Ermurache, 5 Sorin Ardeleanu, 6 Robert Reisenbuchler, 7 Ioan Ionescu, 8 Petre Brănișteanu, 9 Dan Niculescu, 10 Costel Cernat, 11 Andrei Constantin, 12 Anton Netolitzchi, 13 Constantin Popa, 14 Gabriel David, 15 Alexandru Vinereanu (Coach: Gheorghe Novac)

2017 EuroBasket: finished 23rd among 24 teams

4 Andrei Mandache, 6 Catalin Petrisor, 8 Radu Paliciuc, 9 Vlad Moldoveanu, 10 Bogdan Nicolescu, 11 Octavian Calota, 13 Alexandru Olah, 14 Titus Nicoara, 15 Emanuel Cățe, 25 Rolland Torok, 26 Catalin Baciu, 32 Nandor Kuti (Coach: Marcel Tenter)

Kit

Manufacturer
2014: Ancada
2015–2017: Peak
2019–present: Spalding

Sponsor
2020–present: Banca Transilvania

See also

Sport in Romania
Romania women's national basketball team
Romania men's national under-20 basketball team
Romania men's national under-18 basketball team
Romania men's national under-16 basketball team
Romania men's national 3x3 team

Notes

References

External links

Official website 
Romania FIBA profile
Romanian National Team – Men at Eurobasket.com
Romania Basketball Records at FIBA Archive

Videos
Romania v Spain - Highlights - FIBA EuroBasket 2022 - Qualifiers

Men's national basketball teams
1932 establishments in Romania
Romania national basketball team